Sporhase v. Nebraska ex rel. Douglas, 458 U.S. 941 (1982), was a case in which the United States Supreme Court decided that a Nebraska statute forbidding commercial exportation of water from Nebraska was unconstitutional in that it violated the dormant commerce clause.

The boundary between the states of Nebraska and Colorado passed through a farm owned by Sporhase. He drilled a well in Nebraska and used the water to irrigate his land on both sides of the boundary. Under the 11th Amendment, he could not sue the state of Nebraska in a federal district court; consequently his suit had to proceed in the state courts in Nebraska until he petitioned the United States Supreme Court to review it.

See also
List of United States Supreme Court cases, volume 458

Further reading

External links
 

United States Constitution Article One case law
United States Supreme Court cases
United States Supreme Court cases of the Burger Court
United States Dormant Commerce Clause case law
United States water case law
1982 in the environment
1982 in United States case law